Lac la Plonge is a glacial lake in Saskatchewan in the basin of the Beaver River near Lac Île-à-la-Crosse. It is located in the Boreal Forest near the Canadian Shield. Lac La Plonge on its north shore is accessed via Highway 165.

The La Plonge River flows west from the north west section of the lake into the Beaver River at Beauval. The lake is also the site of the Lac La Plonge Dam, which is operated by the Saskatchewan Water Security Agency.

Fish species
The lake's fish species include walleye, sauger, yellow perch, northern pike, lake trout, lake whitefish, cisco, white sucker, longnose sucker and burbot.

See also
List of lakes of Saskatchewan
Saskatchewan Water Security Agency
List of dams and reservoirs in Canada

References

External links
Statistics Canada
Anglersatlas.com
https://web.archive.org/web/20151103002043/http://www.publications.gov.sk.ca/details.cfm?p=11115

Lakes of Saskatchewan
Division No. 18, Unorganized, Saskatchewan